Shuko Aoyama and Ena Shibahara were the defending champions, having won the previous event in 2019, but chose not to participate.

Jeļena Ostapenko and Kateřina Siniaková won the title, defeating Nadiia Kichenok and Raluca Olaru in the final, 6–2, 4–6, [10–8]. Ostapenko and Siniaková won the title after saving three match points in their quarterfinal match against Viktória Kužmová and Alexandra Panova. This was the first time that Siniaková won a doubles title without regular partner Barbora Krejčíková since January 2019.

Seeds

Draw

Draw

References

External links
 Main Draw

2021 Women's Doubles
Kremlin Cup – Doubles
2021 in Russian women's sport